Tattva may refer to:

Indian religions
 Tattva, a Sanskrit word meaning 'thatness', 'principle', 'reality' or 'truth'.
 Tattva (Jainism), the reals or the seven (sometimes nine) fundamental principles of Jainism.
 Tattva (Samkhya)
 Tattva (Kashmir Shaivism)
 Tattva (Siddha medicine)
 Tattva (Ayyavazhi)

Music
 "Tattva" (song), a 1996 hit song by Kula Shaker.

See also
 Namarupa
 Kosha